Liszna  (Lishna) is a village in the administrative district of Gmina Sanok, within Sanok County, Subcarpathian Voivodeship, in south-eastern Poland.

The village has a population of 340.

References

Liszna